This is a list of Neanderthal fossils.

Some important European Neanderthals

Remains of more than 300 European Neanderthals have been found. This is a list of the most notable.

Southwest Asian Neanderthals 
As of 2017, this list of Southwest Asian Neanderthals may be considered essentially complete.

Central and North Asian Neanderthals 
Central Asian Neanderthals were found in Uzbekistan and North Asian Neanderthals in Asian Russia.

See also
List of Southwest Asian Neanderthals
Neanderthal Museum
List of fossil sites
List of human fossils

Notes

References

Further reading

External links

 
Human evolution